Gustav Sandberg Magnusson (born 3 February 1992) is a Swedish footballer who plays for IF Brommapojkarna as a midfielder.

References

External links
 

1992 births
Living people
Association football midfielders
IF Brommapojkarna players
Swedish footballers
Sweden youth international footballers
Allsvenskan players
Superettan players